The shooting guard (SG), also known as the two, two guard or off guard, is one of the five traditional positions in a regulation basketball game. A shooting guard's main objective is to score points for their team and steal the ball on defense. Some teams ask their shooting guards to bring up the ball as well; these players are known colloquially as combo guards. A player who can switch between playing shooting guard and small forward is known as a swingman.

Characteristics and styles of play 
The Basketball Handbook by Lee Rose describes a shooting guard as a player whose primary role is to score points. As the name suggests, most shooting guards are good long-range shooters, typically averaging 35–40 percent from three-point range. Many shooting guards are also strong and athletic, and have the ability to get inside the paint and drive to the basket.

Typically, shooting guards are taller than point guards. Height at the position varies; many bigger shooting guards also play small forward. Shooting guards should be good ball handlers and be able to pass reasonably well, though passing is not their main priority. Since good shooting guards may attract double-teams, they are frequently the team's back-up ball handlers to the point guard and typically get a fair number of assists.

Shooting guards must be able to score in various ways, especially late in a close game when defenses are tighter. They need to have a good free throw percentage too, to be reliable in close games and to discourage opposing players from fouling. Because of the high level of offensive skills shooting guards need, they are often a team's primary scoring option, and sometimes the offense is built around them.

In the NBA, there are some shooting guards referred to as "3 and D" players. The term 3 and D implies that the player is a good 3 point shooter who can also play solid (sometimes elite) defense. The 3 and D player has become very important as the game sways to be perimeter oriented.

Good shooting guards can often play point guard to a certain extent. Notable shooting guards include Michael Jordan, Kobe Bryant, Dwyane Wade, Manu Ginobili, James Harden, Klay Thompson, Clyde Drexler, Jerry West, George Gervin, Vince Carter, Donovan Mitchell, and Allen Iverson.

Skills and qualities 
It is important for a shooting guard to develop skills in defense, passing and strength in addition to shooting ability. This position displays the most movement offensively when trying to get an open shot, along with keeping things under control on the defensive end.

Understanding that this position is shaped around the shooting ability of the athlete, many external abilities implemented into the player will overall help construct the potential the athlete possesses. External abilities would consist of strong ball handling, a sharp mind, and the development of a high basketball intelligence.

Shooting guards are often used as the secondary ball handler to help eliminate pressure of the 1 guard.

Notes

References
The Basketball Handbook (pg 14/15) (2004). Lee H. Rose

External links

Basketball positions
 
Basketball terminology